Pisha paysha is a card game of Ashkenazi Jewish origin, similar to beggar-my-neighbour. It is typically played with children.

References

20th-century card games
Card games for children
Two-player card games
Yiddish words and phrases